Frederick Julius Meyer (May 17, 1900 – March 12, 1983) was an American wrestler who competed in the 1920 Summer Olympics. Meyer, who was Jewish  was born in Chicago and died in Los Angeles.

In 1920, he won the bronze medal in the freestyle wrestling heavyweight class.

As part of a trend in which religious and ethnic organizations used their facilities to develop competitive athletes, Meyer was one of a number of national champions whose skills were fostered at the Chicago Hebrew Institute. Meyer, who had been wrestling for the Chicago Hebrew Institute since he was nine years old, joined Walter Mauer of the Institute at the 1920 Summer Games in Antwerp, Belgium, marking the first time that Jewish athletes representing a Jewish club had been selected for the U.S. team. Dr. George Eisen of Nazareth College included Meyer on his list of Jewish Olympic Medalists.

See also
 List of select Jewish wrestlers

References

External links
 

1900 births
1983 deaths
Sportspeople from Chicago
Jewish American sportspeople
Olympic bronze medalists for the United States in wrestling
Wrestlers at the 1920 Summer Olympics
American male sport wrestlers
Medalists at the 1920 Summer Olympics
20th-century American Jews